The Deal School District is a community public school district that serves students in kindergarten through eighth grade from Deal, in Monmouth County, New Jersey, United States. The school was established in September 1953.

As of the 2018–19 school year, the district, comprised of one school, had an enrollment of 169 students and 17.1 classroom teachers (on an FTE basis), for a student–teacher ratio of 9.9:1. In the 2016–17 school year, Deal had the 35th-smallest enrollment of any school district in the state, with 165 students.

As a participant in the Interdistrict Public School Choice Program, the majority of the district's students live outside of Deal, with 37 slots allocated for choice students in the 2014-15 school year, 20 of which were for Kindergarten students. As of the 2002-03 school year, nearly 75% of students at Deal School attended from outside the district on a tuition basis, paying $4,300 per student, per year, with students coming from the neighboring communities of Loch Arbour, Asbury Park, Ocean Township, Red Bank and Belmar. By the 2013-14 school year, nearly 90% of the district's enrollment was from choice students, for whom the state paid the district $12,500 in supplemental aid per student.

For ninth through twelfth grades, students attend Shore Regional High School, as part of a sending/receiving relationship. As of the 2018–19 school year, the high school had an enrollment of 649 students and 57.2 classroom teachers (on an FTE basis), for a student–teacher ratio of 11.3:1. The relationship with Shore Regional succeeds a previous agreement under which students from deal attended Asbury Park High School in neighboring Asbury Park as part of a sending/receiving relationship with the Asbury Park Public Schools.

School
Deal School served an enrollment of 169 students in grades K–8 as of the 2018–19 school year.

Administration
Core members of the district's administration are:
Donato J. Saponaro Sr., Superintendent of Schools
Pia Lordi, Business Administrator

Michael Salvatore, superintendent of the Long Branch Public Schools, had overseen the Deal district under a shared services arrangement reached in August 2014 in which Salvatore was paid an additional $10,000 from Deal on top of his $165,000 base salary.

Board of education
The district's board of education, comprised of five members, sets policy and oversees the fiscal and educational operation of the district through its administration. As a Type II school district, the board's trustees are elected directly by voters to serve three-year terms of office on a staggered basis, with either one or two seats up for election each year held (since 2012) as part of the November general election. The board appoints a superintendent to oversee the day-to-day operation of the district.

References

External links
Deal School District
 
School Data for the Deal School District, National Center for Education Statistics

Deal, New Jersey
1953 establishments in New Jersey
School districts established in 1953
New Jersey District Factor Group none
School districts in Monmouth County, New Jersey
Public K–8 schools in New Jersey